The Zahliote Group – ZG (Arabic: مجموعة زحلوتي | Majmueat Zhlouty), known also as the Groupement Zahliote (GZ) in French, was a small Lebanese Christian militia raised in the Greek-Catholic town of Zahlé in the Beqaa Valley, which fought in the Lebanese Civil War from 1975 to 1981.

Structure and organization
The ZG was led by Aziz Wardah, a wealthy banker and entrepreneur, who formed it in 1975 as a movement of middle-class businessmen who contested the rule of the local feudal clans, gathered in the so-called 'Seven Families' (Arabic: سبع عائلات | Sabe Eayilat) coalition headed by the za'im (political boss) Joseph Skaff. Wardah's Zahliotes were estimated at about 100-500 fighters equipped with small-arms purchased on the black market or taken from Lebanese Army depots and Internal Security Forces (ISF) Police stations, backed by a few gun trucks or technicals (Willys M38A1 MD jeeps, CJ-5 Jeeps, Toyota Land Cruiser (J40) and Land-Rover series II-III pickups, and Chevrolet C-10/C-15 Cheyenne light pickups) armed with Heavy machine-guns and recoilless rifles, controlled most of Zahlé until 1978, when they were finally absorbed into the Lebanese Forces.

The Zahliotes in the Lebanese Civil War (1975-1981)
On 28 August 1975, The Zahliote Group militia clashed at Zahlé with the predominantly Maronite Zgharta Liberation Army (ZLA, a.k.a. the "Marada Brigade") militia led by Tony Frangieh, despite the intervention of Lebanese Army troops in a vain attempt to curb the fighting. Allied with the other rightist Christian factions in the Lebanese Front, the Zahliotes held their ground successfully against the PLO, the Leftist Muslim Lebanese National Movement (LNM) militias and Lebanese Arab Army (LAA) attempts to take Zahlé in early 1976. On 14 January that year, they defended their town when it was besieged by PLO – LNM forces in retaliation for the fall of the Palestinian refugee camp of Dbayeh in the hands of the Lebanese Front's Christian militias earlier that same day. 

Although the ZG was integrated into the Lebanese Forces structure in 1978, its former members certainly played a role in the defence of their town on 20 December 1980, when the Free Tigers militia (a.k.a. the "Hannache Group") managed to seize by force the local National Liberal Party (NLP) offices and again in March 1981, when it was besieged by the Syrian Army during the Battle of Zahleh.

See also 
Lebanese Arab Army
Lebanese Civil War
Lebanese Forces
Lebanese Forces – Executive Command
Lebanese Front
Lebanese National Movement
List of weapons of the Lebanese Civil War
Tigers Militia
Zgharta Liberation Army

Notes

References

Alain Menargues, Les Secrets de la guerre du Liban: Du coup d'état de Béchir Gémayel aux massacres des camps palestiniens, Albin Michel, Paris 2004.  (in French)
Denise Ammoun, Histoire du Liban contemporain: Tome 2 1943-1990, Éditions Fayard, Paris 2005.  (in French) – 
Fawwaz Traboulsi, Identités et solidarités croisées dans les conflits du Liban contemporain; Chapitre 12: L'économie politique des milices: le phénomène mafieux, Thèse de Doctorat d'Histoire – 1993, Université de Paris VIII, 2007. (in French) – 
Jean Sarkis, Histoire de la guerre du Liban, Presses Universitaires de France - PUF, Paris 1993.  (in French)
Joseph Hokayem, L'armée libanaise pendant la guerre: un instrument du pouvoir du président de la République (1975-1985), Lulu.com, Beyrouth 2012. , 1291036601 (in French) – 
Makram Rabah, Conflict on Mount Lebanon: The Druze, the Maronites and Collective Memory, Alternative Histories, Edinburgh University Press, 2020 (1st edition). 
Samuel M. Katz, Lee E. Russel, and Ron Volstad, Armies in Lebanon 1982-84, Men-at-arms series 165, Osprey Publishing Ltd, London 1985. 
Samir Kassir, La Guerre du Liban: De la dissension nationale au conflit régional, Éditions Karthala/CERMOC, Paris 1994.  (in French)
R.D. Mclaurin, The battle of Zahle, Aberdeen, MD: U.S. Army Human Engineering Laboratory, Aberdeen Proving Ground, Technical memorandum 8-86, 1986.

Further reading

 Fawwaz Traboulsi, A History of Modern Lebanon: Second Edition, Pluto Press, London 2012. 
 Rex Brynen, Sanctuary and Survival: the PLO in Lebanon, Boulder: Westview Press, Oxford 1990.  – 
Robert Fisk, Pity the Nation: Lebanon at War, London: Oxford University Press, (3rd ed. 2001).  – 
 William W. Harris, Faces of Lebanon: Sects, Wars, and Global Extensions, Princeton Series on the Middle East, Markus Wiener Publishers, Princeton 1997. , 1-55876-115-2

External links
Chamussy (René) – Chronique d’une guerre: Le Liban 1975-1977 – éd. Desclée – 1978 (in French)
Histoire militaire de l'armée libanaise de 1975 à 1990 (in French)

Lebanese Front
Factions in the Lebanese Civil War
Lebanese factions allied with Israel